WIFV annual film festival is an annual film festival sponsored by Women in Film and Video, Washington, D.C. chapter. They were co-sponsored by the American Film Institute, with grants by the National Endowment for the Arts.

Films screened

1985 'The Return of the Soldier Julie Christie, "Summerspell" Lina Shanklin, "A Woman Like Eve" Nouchka van Brakel, "Far from Poland" Jill Godmilow, "Ornette: Portrait of A Jazz Pioneer" Shirley Clarke, "La Quarantine" Anne Claire Poirier
1987 "Square Dance" Jane Alexander, "Dad End Kids" JoAnne Akalaitis, "Working Girls" Lizzie Borden, "The Passion of Remembrance"
1989 "Gingerale Afternoon", "God's Will" Julia Cameron, "Misplaced" Lisa Zwerling, "Shag" Julie Brown
1996 "Your Name in Cellulite" Gail Noonan, "Lipstick" Harriet McKern, "Naked Acts" Brigett M. Davis

References

Film festivals in Washington, D.C.